is a media franchise consisting of a manga, several anime series, a trading card game and several video games. The original manga, accompanied with his sequels, sold 4.5 million copies in Japan.

Plot
The story centers around the card game Duel Masters, which revolves around five civilizations consisting of Fire, Water, Light, Darkness and Nature. The original storyline follows Shobu Kirifuda, a young boy who likes to play Duel Masters. He and a few duelists are known to bring the monsters on the cards to life in their duels. Shobu engages in this card game so that he can be the best duelist like his father was.

Characters

Main characters

A Knight's apprentice. He aspires to become a great duelist like his father, Shori Kirifuda. Shobu keeps a positive attitude throughout the series, insisting on dueling for fun as opposed to simply winning. In the first season, Shobu takes on the challenge of defeating the temple champion, Hakuoh, who he feels has become corrupt with power. Throughout this portion of the series, Shobu must defeat Hakuoh's underlings while he struggles to understand the true spirit of dueling. In his duel with Hakuoh, as Shobu faces off against the strongest of all Angel Commands, he is forced to make a crucial decision. He must either accept the help of his friends and "wind up like Ko" (Kokujo having been injured in a Kaijudo duel) or give up on his friends and "end up like Hakuoh", who had become cold and heartless. All in all Shobu is brave, strong, and has the guts never to give up, just like his favorite creatures. He uses a Fire Civilization deck which later becomes a Dragon Deck and even later evolves into a Dragon/Angel Command deck. After being defeated in a later season he loses most of his deck but is guided to his father's deck by the spirits of Bolmeteus Samurai Dragon and Bolbalzak "Sword Flash" Dragon. This new deck is a Dragon and Samurai deck. Soon after he combined elements from the 2 decks and created a Samurai Dragon/Angel Command deck (Fire, Light & Nature civilizations). As of Duel Masters Cross his main cards are: Bolmeteus "Kensei" Dragon, Bolshack Yamato Dragon, Bolbalzak "Sword Flash" Dragon and Saint Bolshack, Spiritual Dragon. After losing Saint Bolshack, Valkiryas Musashi, Ultimate Battle Dragon and Sword Flash Galaxy, Super Champ became his trump cards as well. Later, his trump card becomes Bolshack NEX. He defeated Zakira with Bolpheaus Heaven in the manga. Shobu also appeared in the anime movie "Rockman.EXE: Program Between Light and Darkness."

 (Japanese); Joe Ochman (English)
Hakuoh is the archrival of Shobu Kirifuda. Hakuoh came from a prominent dueling family, and specialized in Light civilization from a young age. At that time, he was a reflection of Shobu, a young kid who loved the game above all else. This changed, however, when a mysterious duelist appeared and challenged Hakuoh to his first Kaijudo duel. Unaware of the dangers involved in a Kaijudo duel, Hakuoh became overconfident and was nearly killed as a result. Instead of being crushed by his opponent's attack, however, Hakuoh was pushed out of the way by his mother, who was fatally wounded. Since then, Hakuoh has become a cold-hearted villain and Shobu's main rival. Hakuoh no longer sees any fun in dueling and decides that one's value as a human being is determined by their ability to win and will rest at nothing to "be the best". As a result, Hakuoh becomes a dueling champion and the leader of the White Soldiers. To protect his title, Hakuoh is protected by four Temple Guardians. Later in the series, he is challenged by Shobu Kirifuda (who Hakuoh recognizes as a reflection of his former self). As he is consumed with power, Hakuoh not only desires to defeat Shobu, but to crush him entirely and destroy his dreams of dueling. "For when I defeat you, you shall never duel again!". He proclaims himself as "a shadowy reflection" of Shobu. As the dueling intensifies, Shobu realizes the danger in abandoning his friends, as he may wind up like the heartless Hakuoh. Hakuoh is finally defeated by Shobu and later he befriends him for showing him the true nature of dueling. In Duel Masters Charge, Hakuoh allies himself with Zakira (the series' main villain) after being brainwashed into becoming his pawn, "White". In Duel Masters Zero, he becomes similar to his old self and appears to be working with Professor Machi (a mad scientist who lures duelists to a deserted island). In Duel Masters Cross, he tries to stop Zakira by challenging him to a kaijudo duel, but was defeated. Afterwards, his "White" personality overtook him once again. However, after beating Mimi in a duel, he was able to return to his old self after seeing the damage he had caused. Hakuoh uses a Light Civilization deck. In Season one, it is a mono-civilization deck focusing on a combination of Urth, Purifying Elemental, Szubs Kin Twighlight Guardian, and Dia Nork, Moonlight Guardian, with his intent on evolving Urth into Alcadeias, Lord of Spirits. This first deck relies heavily on blockers, which leaves him vulnerable to Shobu's "Scralet Skyterror." Later, in Duel Masters Cross, he is given a Light/Darkness Knight deck by Zakira. His main cards are Urth Purifying Elemental, Hanusa Radiance Elemental, Alcadies Lord of Spirits, Alphadios Lord of Spirits, King Alcadeias, Holy Gaia; Perfect Galaxy, Spirit of Immortality; and most recently, Nero Gryphis, Mystic Light Emperor.

A self-proclaimed "evil genius" and another of Shobu's main rivals throughout the series. Other characters make fun of his outlandishly styled long hair and all-black leather outfit. He uses a Darkness Civilization Deck, but later on in the subsequent series, it becomes a Darkness/Water deck. He has earned the nickname "Black Death", because of his relentless tactics and masterful use of Darkness civilization. Kokujo claims to have become evil because others said he could not become a kaijudo master. In Season 2 he helps Shobu to defeat P.L.O.O.P. (once again using a mono-Darkness deck). In Season 3, he defeated Mimi but lost to Yumama in the semifinals (due to her using supernatural powers in the end to knock him unconscious). In Duel Masters Charge he helps Shobu in their quest, but still works individually. His ultimate cards are Dorballom, Lord of Demons, Ballom, Master of Death, Ballom Emperor, Lord of Demons, Ballom Monarch, the Dark Reaper King, XENOM, the Reaper King, Dark Strike, Reaper Beast, Bell Hell De Gaul, Footprint of the Reaper and most recently added, Black Ganveet, Legion of Darkness.

Shobu's family

Shobu's father and a world famous duelist. Shori left home to continue his training, but he continued to miss his family every day. He reappeared in Season 2 but disappeared again after the defeat of P.L.O.O.P. He makes an appearance in "Duel Masters the Movie" to assist Shobu, only to disappear at its end. In Duel Masters Charge he was believed to have been dead in a Kaijudo duel protecting the "Duel Master's Proof" from Zakira. However, as revealed in Duel Masters Cross Shock, he entrusted Extreme Bucket Man with a deck case to be given to Shobu. It wasn't until later that he was discovered to be alive (only previously 'deleted') and free from exile where he reunites with his son. He plays with a deck similar to, but more advanced than Shobu's, with Bolberg Cross Dragon acting his trump card.

Shobu's mother and Shori's wife. To help Shobu on different occasions, she has occasionally taken on the persona of a second "Dragon Mask" (the persona being first used by Knight) and challenged him.

Shobu's friends

Shobu's best friend and loyal sidekick. Even though he is an expert at the rules Rekuta is a terrible duelist, often going without a single win during a tournament. He's often seen with his portable laptop to keep track of important duels. As a running joke, he is often accidentally sent flying into the air. In one instance which only occurred in the English version, he was sent flying into space (against a live-action backdrop) and crashed into a space station. He has almost every card ever released (since his father  owns a card shop) but cannot correctly use the cards. In the manga, his "otakudom" in card collecting often helps Shobu, or at least give him a clue or a hint towards winning a duel.

Appearing only in the anime, Sayuki Manaka is another one of Shobu's close friends, who is also in his class at school. A kind girl with a sweet and usually soft-spoken disposition, she cares deeply for Shobu and is always ready to help him and comfort him when he's down. In addition, she is always present to see Shobu's matches and constantly cheers him on. Sayuki is shown to participate in duels on occasion, but is mainly there for Shobu throughout the series. In the English version, Sayuki has an attitude despite being soft-spoken, and is very critical.

Another member of Shobu's posse. Mimi first appeared to be both ditzy and inept at dueling, but was later revealed to be the second of the Four Temple Guardians at the Junior Duelist Center and an expert player. Mimi also has an undisclosed amount of super-strength which enables her to bring down any walls and other obstacles as well as having good martial arts abilities. As the first season closes with the duel between Shobu and Hakuoh, Mimi reveals that Hakuoh was not always a heartless duelist and her personal connection to Hakuoh has developed into a slight crush throughout the series. She mostly uses Nature Civilization cards, but tends to use Shield Triggers from all 5 civilizations.

A midget in a pink bear suit and is always seen sucking a pacifier and an 8-year-old boy. He rides around in a motor baby carriage and uses a Water Civilization deck, he is a skillful duelist and has even defeated Mimi (a powerful duelist in her own right) fairly easily. In Season 3, he uses a Darkness/Water deck, he also withdraws from the tournament after losing to Yumama.

Dr. Root is a mad scientist who is Boy George's boss and an expert duelist. Outside of that, he also a human-resembling robot named Mr. Perfect and a pilotable giant robot. His eccentric methods always have some hidden lesson to help Shobu and his friends. Dr. Root's real name is Leroy. In Duel Masters Zero, he takes charge of training Shobu and his friends. He has a deck of Survivors in season 1 and in charge he has a Darkness/Water deck similar to Boy George's deck.

NAC is a manga only character. He was involved in the making of "Duel Masters", assisting Dai Matsumoto (the manga author's nickname) as a technical advisor (the manga's plot is based around Magic: The Gathering). He has appeared in the manga both as NAC and as a more realistic cameo of himself known as "Nakamura-san". According to one of Dai Matsumoto's omake sections in the manga, NAC was also involved in the development of the Duel Masters card game.

Knight is Shobu's mysterious and soft-spoken mentor. In the English "dub", his inner monologue is a source of much of the show's mature and subtle humor. Despite being Shobu's mentor, he is usually unable to assist his student in times of need due to either Shobu's stubborn attitude or Knight being unable to show up at the scene (such is the case in Shobu's duel with Hakuoh, when Knight reveals he never taught Shobu about dueling against the Light Civilization). Knight does not appear in the manga, although the manga character NAC is similar to him. On one occasion, Dr. Root had Knight take on a "Dragon Mask" persona to duel Shobu in order for him to reclaim his tournament pass. Knight's character is loosely based on the manga only character NAC.
Extreme Bucketman

A short duelist who wears a bucket on his head. No one knows if Bucketman is male or female. Rekuta believes that Extreme Bucketman is annoying. Bucketman defeated Kokujo before their official match. He lost to Yumama by surrendering, and later, under Zakira's mind control, duels against Shobu. His Deck is Fire and Nature, mostly involving Earth Dragons and Firebirds. His trump card is Soul Phoenix, Avatar of Unity. In the final duel against Yumama, he gives the card to Shobu. In Duel Masters Cross, he plays a Snow Faerie and Initiate deck.
 
Very little is known about the leader of the "Temple" (an organization within the Junior Duelist's Center). Throughout the first season he appears in a long black, hooded robe with his face half concealed by his long blond hair. "The Master" appears as Hakuoh's teacher and dueling coach. Knight suggests that the Master has only taken an interest in Hakuoh because he plans to use the young duelist in obtaining his "revenge" against the creature world who defeated him in a duel causing him to never duel again. "Master" seems to be responsible for Hakuoh's brainwashing and even pushes Hakuoh to attack Shobu with Alcadeias after his defeat. Master disappears after Hakuoh's defeat in Season 1 and hasn't reappeared since.
Fritz the Goblin
Fritz is a goblin who works at the Junior Duelist's Center. He is often mistakenly called a squirrel. Anyone who wants to enroll in the Junior Duelist's Center has to answer his riddles.

He was discharged by Hakuoh after losing to Shobu (who he had quickly befriended). Nobody knows how old he is and he often carries around a man-purse and an abacus. Kintaro returned in Season Three, having regained Hakuoh's friendship. He lost to Extreme Bucketman in the finals.

Temple Guardians
The Temple Guardians are the elite members of the White Soldiers that work under Hakuoh. Among the members of the Temple Guardians are:

He uses a Fire deck, and during his duel with Shobu he purposely mimicked everything he did in order to throw him off. Mikuni managed to defeat Shobu, but Mimi managed to convince the Master to invite Shobu to try again in a duel against Mikuni. He is defeated by Shobu the second time around and thus he quickly befriends him. Due to his defeat at the hands of Shobu, Hakuoh ends up discharging Mikuni. He resurfaces in Season Three having regained Hakouh's friendship. He lost to Robby Rotten, where his name mysteriously changed to Johnny Coolburns. It was later "explained" that this and other plot holes in the show were due to Season Three happening in an alternate dimension.
Temple Guardian 2
See Mimi Tasogare
 / Benny HaHa

The third of the Four Temple Guardians. In the English dub, Benny is Mimi's "twin brother" where he had different plastic surgeries to look older where he claims that he is one minute older than Mimi. Benny is often seen piloting a robot suit and first appears where he destroys Mimi's access card upon her defeat and wrecks her deck. He often cheats and relies on deceit in his duels. His constant defeat at the hands of the series' heroes has led him to hate both Shobu and Hakuoh. Benny returns in Season Three claiming to have turned over a new leaf, but this is quickly revealed to be an act. Benny forces Hakuoh into dueling before their match in a self-made Duel Masters Battle Arena by taking Aizen and Johnny Coolburns as hostage. As each of Hakuoh's shields are broken, Benny shocks his prisoners with a hidden trap, as a part of his plan to torture Hakuoh by harming his friends. As a result, Hakuoh vows to defeat Benny without losing any more shields, and agrees to forfeit if another one of his shields is broken in order to spare his friends. Hakuoh manages to complete the "perfect duel" and defeat Benny despite his many attempts to cheat. Afterward, Benny detonates a bomb beneath the stadium and seriously injures Hakuoh so that he is unable to duel him the next morning. With Hakuoh eliminated, he ends up dueling Shobu again and loses. It is revealed that he is also working with Yumama. After he lost to Shobu, Benny was banished by Yumama and trapped in a room with Boy George which they both escaped in the same episode. He uses a Water Civilization Deck and later a Wave Striker Deck during his tournament match with Shobu.

The fourth of the Four Temple Guardians who also worked as the Temple's janitor. He was defeated by Kyoshiro Kokujo before he could fight Shobu. He also lost to Hakuoh in Duel Masters Battle Arena Tournament. In the later season, he is shown to be using a Fire/Light Civilization deck. His trump card appears to be Warlord Aizonius.

P.L.O.O.P.
Short for Powerful Loyal Order of Princes, P.L.O.O.P. is an evil organization that plot to use monsters from the Civilizations of the Creature World to take over Earth. This organization is seen only in the "second season" that was created for America. Among the known members are:
Prince Irving the Terrible
Shobu encountered him in the Light Civilization.
Prince Melvin the Conqueror
Shobu encountered him in the Water Civilization.
Princess Pollyana of Green Gables
She is a minor P.L.O.O.P. member who Shobu encountered in the Nature Civilization and works with Prince Wilbur the Great. She first appeared in Logville Village where she dueled against Shobu and lost. Princess Pollyana helped Prince Wilbur to capture Master Pangaea. She dueled against Flora (whose father was captured by Pollyana and Wilbur) and lost to her.
Prince Wilburg the Great
Shobu encountered him in the Nature Civilization.
Prince Maurice the Merciless
Shobu encountered him in the Darkness Civilization.
Prince Herbert the Ruthless
He is a minor PLOOP member who Shobu encountered at the gates of the Fire Civilization.
Prince Eugene the Mean
Shobu encountered him in the Fire Civilization. Eugene used to be a dueling champ in the good world and that he even beat Knight in the Season Two episode "Deck Me Baby One More Time." Knight and Eugene meet and Knight explains what happened. Eugene also says "I used to duel for trophies. Now I duel for money."

Black Soldiers
The Black Soldiers are a group of duelists that are the opposite form of Hakuoh's White Soldiers. Most of the Black Soldiers consists of duelists that were unable to defeat Hakuoh when wanting to become a member of the White Soldiers. They entered the Battle Arena Tournament to beat all of its players. After the defeat of most of the Black Soldier, most of the unnamed members left the group when Yumama came into view. Besides its various unnamed members, among its known members are:
Robby Rotten
Leader of the Black Soldiers. He wanted to be a member of Hakouh's White Soldiers, but was denied membership even when he had defeated Mikuni. He formed the Black Soldiers so that he can duel Hakuoh. Unfortunately for him, he was defeated by Shobu and was last seen being interrogated by Yumama about Shobu.
Akakan
Member of the Black Soldiers and Robby Rotten's right-hand man. He is the strongest of the Black Soldiers. Akakan was defeated by Boy George.
Multi-Card Monty
Member of the Black Soldiers. He likes to tell long stories and confuse his opponent before the duel while shuffling his deck. Akakan was defeated by Mimi.
Ishiguro
Member of the Black Soldiers. Ishiguro had previously wanted to meet Hakuoh when he was a student of the Temple. He defeated most of the Temple's students in a duel, but lost to Mikuni (who admitted that his duel against Ishiguro was tough). He joined up with the Black Soldiers in order to duel Hakuoh and took part in the Battle Arena Tournament. Ishiguro was defeated in a duel by Hakuoh who acknowledges Ishiguro as a strong duelist.

Other antagonists
 / Yumama
A mysterious girl who can duel and read a book at the same time. She has the ability to stand on the ceiling and is commonly seen reading her teen heart throb book, filled with 400 pages of pictures of cute boys, although towards the end of the third season, she discovers that the pages are really blank. She defeated Boy George, Yuki and Kokujo right before they were supposed to duel making her win instantly. She was a childhood friend of Extreme Bucketman. While she appears to be the cause of all the disruption in the tournament, she is really a pawn of her malicious older brother, Zakira. After she is released, she becomes an ally of Shobu, along with Bucketman. While brainwashed, her trump cards are Cruel Naga, Avatar of Fate and Super Necrodragon Abzo Dolba. In Duel Masters Cross her deck contains all 5 civilizations and is focused on creatures who have the following effect: "If this card is discarded during your opponent's turn, you may put this card into the Battle Zone instead of the Graveyard". Afterwards, she changes her deck into a Light, Water and Darkness civilization deck based on the Knight race using Brunhilde, Ghost Knight and Nero Gryphis, Mystic Light Emperor as her trump cards.

The main antagonist of both the third season, Duel Masters Charge and the Duel Master Cross series. An evil duelist, the nemesis of Shobu's father, and the one controlling Yumama, who is his younger sister, from the start. His goal is to obtain the "Duel Master's Proof" and use it for his evil means. He has multiple agents working under him, and operates from a large castle. His agents are ranked in terms of increasing power from A-Z (Z being himself). He uses a combination of Fire, Darkness and Water cards (most of his creatures are Zombie Dragons) with his deck being focused on sending cards to the graveyard (his and his opponent's), sometimes outright destroying them, and benefiting from it. Later in the series he changes his deck to a Darkness/Light Knight deck, his main trump cards being Romanoff the 1st, Lord of the Demonic Eye, Death Romanoff the 5th, General of the Demonic Eye, King Balcry, Demonic Eye Lord and Supernova Death Dragerion.

A character introduced in Duel Masters Zero who is the most recent antagonist. He invited Shobu and his friends to a tournament on an uncharted island, but it was really a trap. After kidnapping Dr. Root, he forces Shobu, Mimi, and George to duel his associates.

A character introduced in Duel Masters Zero who is the current Duel Master Champion of the world. Darcy was once an apprentice to Professor March. Zakira is challenged by Darcy in one of the final episodes.

Originally appears in Zero Duel Masters as Shobu's newest rival. He starts out as a subordinate of Professor March but in Duel Masters Cross, he joins Shobu and the others in their struggle against Zakira.

Media

Manga
The Duel Masters manga series is written by Shigenobu Matsumoto, and published by Shogakukan in the CoroCoro Comic magazine. While none of manga series have been licensed for the U.S., there was a North American-created comic book by Dreamwave Productions.

The original manga series ran from 1999 to 2005 and was compiled into 17 tankōbon volumes. It was followed by Duel Masters: Fighting Edge from 2005 to 2008 (12 volumes), and Duel Masters Star Cross from 2008 to 2011 (9 volumes). Duel Masters Victory was published from 2011 to 2014 (10 volumes) and features an alternate storyline from the anime of the same name. 
There is also spinoff manga unrelated to the main series such as Duel Hero:Dash (2 volumes), Duel Masters: Legend Champion VICTORY (3 volumes) and Duel Masters: Revolution (5 volumes).

Volumes

Trading card game

The card game first originated in Japan in May 2002 and was marketed by Takara Tomy. It was produced in English by Wizards of the Coast, who purchased the rights to the name Duel Masters from Reality Simulations, Inc., which ran a play-by-mail gladiator game called Duelmasters, now known as Duel2. The English-language printing of the TCG ran from DM-01 Base Set (May 5, 2004) until DM-12 Thrash of the Hybrid Megacreatures (November 2006). It was the twelfth and final expansion released by Wizards of the Coast for the English-language game before it was discontinued in 2006.

The spin-off product, Kaijudo, was announced by Wizards of the Coast in February 2012. A relaunch of the TCG product line with Wizards of the Coast working along with its parent company Hasbro. It was released on June 26, 2012, with the previous Duel Master cards being rendered incompatible. Wizards of the Coast discontinued Kaijudo in 2014.

Anime
The first television series originally premiered in Japan on October 21, 2002, and ran until December 22, 2003. To date, the series has been followed by 13 sequel seasons. Duel Masters was followed by Duel Masters Charge, which is mostly based on the manga; Zero Duel Masters and its sequel Duel Masters Zero, which are an alternate sequel to the first season and ignores the events of Charge; Duel Masters Cross, which the first part recounts the events of the first season and the second part is a direct sequel to Zero; and Duel Masters Cross Shock. From Duel Masters Zero until Duel Masters Victory V3, the series was broadcast in a 12-minute format instead of 24-minute format.

Duel Masters Victory premiered on April 2, 2011, and introduced a new protagonist named Katta Kirifuda, the younger brother of Shobu, and centers around his journey to become a champion. Its storyline follows from the events of the Duel Masters: Star Cross manga series. Victory was followed by Duel Masters Victory V, Duel Masters Victory V3, Duel Masters Versus, Duel Masters Versus Revolution, and Duel Masters Versus Revolution Final. The 2017 Duel Masters anime and its sequels, Duel Masters! and Duel Masters!!, introduced Joe Kirifuda and focused on his adventures in the Creature World.  In April 2020, Duel Masters King was delayed due to the COVID-19 pandemic. The anime returned on May 31, 2020.

A new series titled Duel Masters Win will premiere in September, 2022.

A spin-off series, Shinseiki: Duel Masters Flash aired from April 10, 2006, to March 23, 2007. The series follows Teru Yumemi, who must protect the ARC pendant from the antagonistic Nest organization.

Overview

Episode list

English version
The English-language version of the series was produced by Hasbro Entertainment and Plastic Cow Productions. It made a truncated four-episode preview premiere on Cartoon Network's Toonami block on February 27, 2004. The series then made its official premiere on April 13, 2004, as part of the Saturday Video Entertainment System block, with fewer edits. When Toonami was moved to Saturdays, the block premiered the rest of the series. It was also aired in a 6:00 AM timeslot on early Weekday mornings, as part of Cartoon Network's  Early Prime block, which was aimed at kids who were getting ready to go to school during this time.

Only the first Japanese season was localized for the North American market. Duel Masters Sacred Lands was created specifically for American broadcast and is not based on any storyline from the manga series. The series was produced by Hasbro Studios and Elastic Media Corporation and premiered on Cartoon Network on March 26, 2005. Episodes of the English version are currently available for streaming on Tubi TV.

Duel Masters Charge was eventually produced for the American market as "Duel Masters 2.0", although only the 1st half was aired.

Sacred Lands episodes

Video games

Takara, Atari, and Kids Station each produced their own Duel Masters video games. The games by Takara and Kids Station were only released in Japan while Atari's were only released in North America and Europe. Some of Takara's games were published by Atlus.

Reception
Along with The Magic of Chocolate, Duel Masters won the 66th Shogakukan Manga Award for Best Children's Manga in 2021.

See also

Kaijudo: Rise of the Duel Masters

References

External links
 

1999 manga
2002 anime television series debuts
2004 anime television series debuts
2005 anime television series debuts
2006 anime television series debuts
2007 anime television series debuts
2011 anime television series debuts
2017 anime television series debuts
2005 anime films
2009 anime films
2010 anime films
Anime postponed due to the COVID-19 pandemic
Anime productions suspended due to the COVID-19 pandemic
Brain's Base
Card games in anime and manga
Children's manga
Fantasy anime and manga
Hasbro franchises
Japanese children's animated adventure television series
Nippon Animation
Shogakukan franchises
Shogakukan manga
Studio Hibari
Toonami
TV Tokyo original programming
Winners of the Shogakukan Manga Award for children's manga